

Precambrian
The Paleobiology Database records no known occurrences of Precambrian fossils in Washington.

Paleozoic
 †Alternifenestella
 †Alternifenestella vagrantia – type locality for species
 †Coeloclemis
 †Coeloclemis urhausenii – type locality for species
 †Dybowskiella
 †Dyscritella
 †Dyscritella iwaizakiensis
 †Dyscritellina
 †Fistulamina – tentative report
 †Fistulipora
 †Fistuliramus
 †Fistuliramus pacificus – type locality for species
 †Hayasakapora
 †Hayasakapora erectoradiata – or unidentified comparable form
 †Hyolithellus
  †Kutorgina
 †Mackinneyella
 †Mackinneyella stylettia – type locality for species
 †Meekoporella
 †Meekoporella inflecta – type locality for species
 †Micromitra
 †Nematopora
 †Neoeridotrypella
 †Neoeridotrypella missionensis – type locality for species
  †Nevadia
 †Pamirella
 †Pamirella oculus – type locality for species
 †Parapolypora
 †Pinegopora
 †Pinegopora petita – type locality for species
 †Polypora
 †Polypora arbusca – type locality for species
 †Polyporella
 †Pseudobatostomella
 †Rhombopora – tentative report
 †Rhombotrypella
 †Rhombotrypella kettlensis – type locality for species
 †Sakagamiina – type locality for genus
 †Sakagamiina easternensis – type locality for species
 †Stenopora
 †Streblotrypa – tentative report
 †Tabulipora
 †Tabulipora colvillensis – type locality for species
 †Wjatkella
 †Wjatkella nanea – type locality for species

Mesozoic
 †Anchura
 †Anchura falciformis
 †Canadoceras
 †Canadoceras newberryanum
 †Canadoceras sp.
 †Desmophyllites
 †Desmophyllites diphylloides
 †Dieneroceras
 †Dieneroceras dieneri – or unidentified comparable form
 †Epigondolella
 †Epigondolella abneptis
  †Gaudryceras
 †Gaudryceras denmanense – or unidentified comparable form
 †Homolsomites
 †Homolsomites mutabilis
 †Hoplitoplacenticeras
 †Hoplitoplacenticeras sp.
  †Inoceramus
 †Inoceramus subundatus
 †Inoceramus vancouverensis
 †Juvenites
 †Juvenites septentrionalis – or unidentified comparable form
 †Neophylloceras
 †Neophylloceras ramosum – or unidentified comparable form
  †Olcostephanus
 †Olcostephanus pecki – or unidentified comparable form
 †Owenites
 †Owenites koeneni
  †Pachydiscus
 †Pachydiscus buckhami
 Palaeocypraea
 †Palaeocypraea suciensis – type locality for species
 †Pentzia
 †Pentzia hilgardi
 †Perissitys
 †Perissitys brevirostris
 †Pseudocymia – tentative report
 †Pseudocymia cahalli
 †Pseudoxybeloceras
 †Pseudoxybeloceras lineatum – or unidentified comparable form
 †Sucia – type locality for genus
 †Sucia suavis – type locality for species

Cenozoic

Selected Cenozoic taxa of Washington

 Abies
 Abyssochrysos
 Acanthocardia
 Acer
 †Acer browni
 †Acer chaneyi
 †Acer latahense - type locality for species
 †Acer hillsi - type locality for species
  Acer negundo – or unidentified comparable form
 †Acer republicense - type locality for species
 †Acer stonebergae
 †Acer toradense - type locality for species
 †Acer washingtonense - type locality for species
 †Acer whitebirdense
 †Acherontemys – type locality for genus
 †Acherontemys heckmani – type locality for species
 Actium
 Aegialia
 Aforia
 Agabus
 Agathidium
 †Aglyptorhynchus
 Agonum
 †Agonum cupreum
 †Agonum ferruginosum
 †Ainigmapsychops – type locality for genus
 †Ainigmapsychops inexspectatus – type locality for species
  †Allodesmus
 †Allophylus
  †Allorapisma – type locality for genus
 †Allorapisma chuorum – type locality for species
 Alnus
 †Alnus parvifolia - type locality for species 
 Altica
 Amara
 Amauropsis
 Ammospermophilus
 Amphistegina
 Anadara
 †Anamirta
 Ancistrolepis
 †Anthrax
  †Aphelops
 Aphodius
 Apion
 †Arceuthobium
 †Arctostaphylos
 Argobuccinum
 Artemisia
 Asplenium
 Astrangia
 Astreopora
  †Aturia
 Auleutes
 †Auleutes epilobii – or unidentified comparable form
 Balanophyllia
 Balanus
 †Balanus crenatus
 Barbatia
 †Barghoornia - type locality for genus
 †Barghoornia oblongifolia - type locality for species
  Bassariscus
 Bathybembix
 †Behemotops – type locality for genus
 Bembidion
 †Bembidion fortestriatum
 †Bembidion rusticum
 †Berberis
 Betula
 †Betula leopoldae - type locality for species
 †Betula papyrifera – or unidentified comparable form
 Bibio
  Bison
 Bledius
 †Bohlenia
 †Bohlenia americana - type locality for species
 †Bombus
 †Bonellitia
  †Borophagus
 †Borophagus diversidens
 †Borophagus hilli
 Botrychium
 †Botryococcus
 Brachidontes
 Buccinum
 †Bursera
 Cadulus
 †Caesalpinia
 Calathus
 †Calkinsia
 Callianassa – report made of unidentified related form or using admittedly obsolete nomenclature
 Calliostoma
 Calosoma
 Calyptraea
  †Camelops
 Cancellaria
 Cancer
 Canis
 †Canis lepophagus
  †Capromeryx
 Carabus
 †Carex
 Carya
 Caryophyllia
 Cassidulina
 Castanea
 Castanopsis
 Castor
 †Castor californicus
 Catops
 †Celastrus
 †Ceratophyllum
  †Ceratophyllum demersum
 Cercidiphyllum
 †Cercidiphyllum obtritum
 Cercyon
 Cerithiopsis
 Cervus – tentative report
 Chama
 Charina
 †Charina bottae
 †Cheilanthes
 †Chenopodium
 Chione
 Chlaenius
 †Chlaenius interruptus
 Chlamys
 †Chlamys hastata
  †Chlamys islandica
 †Chrysodomus
 Cibicides
 Cicindela
 †Cicindela oregona
 Cidarina
  †Cimbrophlebia
 Cirsotrema
 Cladrastis
 Clavus
 Clinocardium
 †Clinocardium nuttallii
 Cocculus
 Colpophyllia
 †Colwellia
 Colymbetes
 Comptonia
 †Comptonia columbiana
  Conus
  Corbicula
  Corbula
 Corixa
 †Cormocyon
 Cornus
 †Cornus stolonifera
  Cornus - undescribed species
 Corticaria
 †Cosoryx
 Cossonus
  †Cranioceras
 Craniscus
 †Craspedochiton
 Crenella – tentative report
 Crepidula
 †Cristispira
 Crotalus
 Cryptonatica
 †Cryptonatica affinis
 Cryptophagus
  Cyathea
 Cyclammina
 Cyclocardia
 Cyclostremella
 Cymbiodyta
 †Cynarctus
 Cypraea
 Dendroctonus
 †Dendroctonus rufipennis
 Dendrophyllia
 †Dennstaedtia
 Dentalium
 †Desmatophoca
 †Desmatophoca brachycephala – type locality for species
  †Desmostylus
 †Desmostylus hesperus
 Diapterna
 †Diceratherium
 †Dinofelis
  †Dinokanaga
 †Dinokanaga andersoni – type locality for species
 †Dinokanaga dowsonae
 †Dinokanaga sternbergi – type locality for species
 Diodora
 †Dipoides
 Dosinia
 Dryopteris
 Dyschirius
 †Dyschirius laevifasciatus
 †Dyschirius montanus
 Dytiscus
 Echinophoria
 Elaphe
 †Elaphe vulpina
  Elaphrus
 †Elaphrus americanus
 †Elaphrus californicus
 †Elaphrus clairvillei
 †Elaphrus purpurans
 Eleocharis
 Elphidium
 Emarginula
 †Enhydrocyon
 †Eoceneithycerus - type locality for genus
 †Eoceneithycerus carpenteri - type locality for species
 †Eoprephasma – type locality for genus
 †Eoprephasma hichensi – type locality for species
 †Eorpa
 †Eorpa elverumi – type locality for species
 †Eorpa ypsipeda – tentative report
 Ephedra
 Epitonium
 †Epophthalmia
  †Eporeodon
 †Equisetum
 Equus
  †Equus simplicidens
 Erginus
 †Eucyon
 †Eucyon davisi
 Eulima
 Eusmilia
 Euspira
 †Eutrephoceras
 †Exilia
 Fagopsis
 Fagopsis undulata
 Felis
 †Ficopsis
 Ficus
 Flabellum
  Fothergilla
 Fraxinus
 †Fucaia – type locality for genus
 Fulgoraria
 Fulgurofusus
 Fusinus
  Galeodea
 Galeruca
 Galium
 Gari
 Gastrophysa
 Gemmula
 Georissus
 Gerris
 Globigerina
 Globocassidulina
 Glycymeris
  Glyptostrobus
 Guttulina
 Gymnusa
 Gyrineum
 Gyrinus
 Gyroidina
 Haplocochlias
 Helophorus
 †Hemiauchenia
 †Hemiauchenia macrocephala – or unidentified comparable form
 Heptranchias
 †Heptranchias howelli
 Hiatella
 †Hiatella arctica
  †Hipparion
 Hipponix
 †Hippuris
 †Hippuris vulgaris
 Homalopoma
 Hydrobius
 †Hydrobius fuscipes
 Hydrothassa
 Hygrotus
  †Hypertragulus
 †Hypolagus
 Idas
 Ilex
  †Ilex opaca – or unidentified comparable form
 Ilybius
 Ips
 Ischnochiton
 Isognomon
 Isurus
 †Itea
 Kellia
 Koelreuteria
 †Koelreuteria arnoldi
 †Kolponomos
 †Kolponomos clallamensis
 †Kronokotherium – tentative report
 Lampropeltis
 †Lampropeltis getulus
  †Langeria – type locality for genus
 †Langeria magnifica – type locality for species
 Lapsus
 Latirus
 Laurus
 Leiodes
 Lemna
 Lepidochitona
 Lepidophorus
 Lepidopleurus
 Leptochiton
 Leukoma
 †Leukoma staminea
 Lioligus
 Liotia
  Liquidambar
 Loricera
 Lynx
 †Lynx canadensis
 †Lynx rufus – or unidentified comparable form
 Lyria
 Macaranga
 †Macginitiea
 †Macginitiea gracilis
 Macoma
 †Macoma nasuta
 Macrocallista
 Magdalis
 Magnolia
 †Mammut
 †Mammut americanum
 †Mammuthus
  †Mammuthus columbi
  †Mammuthus primigenius
 Marcia
 Margarites
 Marginella
 †Megalonyx
  †Megalonyx leptostomus
 †Megatylopus
 Melanoides
 †Menyanthes
 †Merycoides
 †Mesoreodon
 †Metanephrocerus
 †Metanephrocerus belgardeae – type locality for species
 Metasequoia
 Microlestes
 Micropeplus
  †Miohippus
 Mitra
 Modiolus
 Montipora
 Morychus
 Murex
 †Mursia
 Mustela
 †Mya
 †Mya arenaria
 †Mya truncata
 Mycetoporus
 Myriophyllum
 †Myriophyllum spicatum
  †Myrmeciites
 Mytilus
 †Mytilus edulis
 Nassarius
 Natica
 Nebria
 †Nebria metallica
 †Nebria sahlbergi
 †Neoephemera
 †Neoephemera antiqua – type locality for species
 Neotoma
  Neptunea
 Nerita
 Neverita
 Notaris
 Notiophilus
 †Notiophilus aquaticus
 Nucella
 †Nucella lamellosa
 Nucula
 Nymphes
  †Nymphes georgei – type locality for species
 Ocypus
 Odocoileus
 †Odocoileus hemionus
 Odostomia
 Olivella
 Ondatra
 Opalia
 Ophiodermella
 Opisthius
 Orchestes
 Oreodytes – or unidentified comparable form
 Oropus
 Ostrea
  †Ostrea lurida
 †Palaeolagus – or unidentified comparable form
 Paliurus
 Pandora
 Panopea
 †Panopea abrupta
 Panthera – tentative report
  †Panthera onca
 †Paraenhydrocyon
 †Paraenhydrocyon josephi
  †Paramylodon
 †Paramylodon harlani
 †Parastylotermes
 †Parastylotermes washingtonensis – type locality for species
 Patelloida
 Patrobus
 †Patrobus stygicus
 Pecten
 †Pediastrum
 †Pedicularis
 Pelecomalium
 Pelophila
 †Pelophila borealis
  Peromyscus
 †Perse – tentative report
 Persea
 Persicula
 Phaedon
 †Phaedon armoraciae
 Phenacomys – or unidentified comparable form
 †Phenacomys intermedius
 Phloeosinus
 Phoebe
 †Phoebe undescribed species 
 †Photinia
 Phryganea
  Picea
 Pinus
 Pitar
 Pituophis
 †Pituophis catenifer
 Plantago
 Platanus
 Plateumaris
 †Plateumaris neomexicana
 Platycarya
  †Platygonus
 Platystethus
 †Plionarctos
 Polinices
 †Polinices lewisii
 Polygonum
 †Polygonum amphibium
 †Polypodium
 †Polystoechotites
  †Polystoechotites barksdalae - type locality for species
 †Polystoechotites falcatus - type locality for species
 †Polystoechotites lewisi - type locality for species
 Populus
 Portlandia
 †Potamides
 †Potamogeton
 †Potentilla
  †Priscacara
 †Procastoroides
 Procyon – tentative report
  †Promerycochoerus
 †Proneuronema
 †Proneuronema wehri - type locality for species
 †Propalosoma – type locality for genus
 †Propalosoma gutierrezae - type locality for species
 †Provanna
  Prunus
 Pseudohylesinus
 †Pseudohylesinus sericeus – or unidentified comparable form
 Pseudoliva
 Pteria
 Pterocarya
 Pterostichus
 †Pterostichus adstrictus
 Pterynotus
 †Puma
 †Puma concolor – tentative report
 Purpura
 Pyramidella
 Pyrgo
 Quedius
 Quercus
 Quinqueloculina
 Rangifer
  Ranina
 Ranunculus
 Rectiplanes – tentative report
 Reichenbachia
 †Republic – type locality for genus
 †Republica hickeyi - type locality for species
 Retusa
 Rhantus
 Rhus
  †Rhus malloryi – type locality for species
 †Rhus typhina – or unidentified comparable form
  †Rhynchonella
 †Ribes
 Rimella
 Rinorea – or unidentified comparable form
 Rosa
 †Rotularia
 Salix
 †Salvinia
 †Sarcobatus
 Sassafras
  †Sassafras hesperia - type locality for species
 †Satherium
 †Satherium piscinarium
 Saxidomus
 Scapanus
 Scaphander
 Scaphinotus
 Schizaster
 Schoepfia
 †Schoepfia republicensis - type locality for species
 †Scirpus
 †Selaginella
 Semicassis
 Serripes
 †Serripes groenlandicus
 †Shepherdia
  †Shepherdia canadensis
 Siderastrea
  Sinum
 Siphonalia
 Sitona
 †Sitsqwayk
 Solariella
 Solen
 Sonoma
 Sorex
 †Sparganium
  Spermophilus
 Spilogale
 Spirotropis
 Spisula
 Spondylus
 †Squaloziphius – type locality for genus
 Squalus
 Stenoplax
 Stenus
 Stephostethus
 Sthereus
  †Stylaster
 Sveltella
 Syntomus
 Taxidea
 †Taxidea taxus
  †Teleoceras
 †Teleoceras major – or unidentified comparable form
 Tellina
 Tenagodus
 Teredo
 Thais
 †Thalictrum
 Thamnophis
 Thomomys
 Thracia
 Thyasira
 Tilia
  †Tilia johnsoni – type locality for species
 Tipula
 †Tournotaris bimaculatus – or unidentified comparable form
 Trechiama – or unidentified related form
 Trechus
 †Trechus ovipennis – or unidentified comparable form
 Tresus
 †Tresus capax
 †Tresus nuttallii
 †Trigonictis macrodon
 Trochita
 Trophon
 Trypophloeus
 †Tsuga
 †Tsuga heterophylla
 †Tsuga mertensiana
 †Tsukada – type locality for genus
  †Tsukada davidiifolia – type locality for species
 Tubastraea
 Turcica
 †Turcica caffea
 †Turcicula
 Turricula
 Turris
  Turritella
 Typha
 †Typha latifolia
 Ulmus
 †Ulteramus – type locality for genus
 †Ulteramus republicensis – type locality for species
 †Upogebia
 Urosalpinx
 Utricularia
 Venericardia
 †Viburnum
 †Vinea – report made of unidentified related form or using admittedly obsolete nomenclature
  Vitis
 Volsella
 Yoldia
 Zannichellia
 †Zannichellia palustris
 †Zarhinocetus
 Zelkova

References

 

Washington